Yumi Maruyama (née Egami, ; born November 30, 1957) is a Japanese former volleyball player who competed in the 1984 Summer Olympics and in the 1988 Summer Olympics. She was born in Setagaya, and grew up in Higashimurayama, Tokyo.  After she attended Shoin Junior and Senior High School, she joined Hitachi Ltd. where she became a captain of the team in 1979.

In 1984 she was a member of the Japanese team which won the bronze medal in the Olympic tournament.

Four years later she finished fourth with the Japanese team in the 1988 Olympic tournament.

References 
 

1957 births
People from Setagaya
Living people
Olympic volleyball players of Japan
Volleyball players at the 1984 Summer Olympics
Volleyball players at the 1988 Summer Olympics
Olympic bronze medalists for Japan
Japanese women's volleyball players
Olympic medalists in volleyball
Asian Games medalists in volleyball
Volleyball players at the 1978 Asian Games
Volleyball players at the 1982 Asian Games
Medalists at the 1984 Summer Olympics
Medalists at the 1978 Asian Games
Medalists at the 1982 Asian Games
Asian Games gold medalists for Japan
Asian Games silver medalists for Japan
20th-century Japanese women